Adiós, Roberto (English language: Goodbye Roberto) is a 1985 Argentine drama film, directed by Enrique Dawi and written by Lito Espinosa. The film starred Víctor Laplace and Carlos Calvo.

Cast
 Carlos Calvo
 Víctor Laplace
 Ana María Picchio
 Héctor Alterio
 Osvaldo Terranova
 María Cristina Laurenz
 Héctor Pellegrini
 María Vaner
 Onofre Lovero
 Ercilia Alonso
 Jacques Arndt
 Pablo Codevila
 Ricardo Jordán
 León Sarthié
 Marcela Sola

Release
The film premiered on 4 April 1985.

External links
 

1985 films
1980s Spanish-language films
1985 drama films
Argentine drama films
Films directed by Enrique Dawi
1980s Argentine films